Pedatadivada is a village located in Denkada tehsil of Vizianagaram District. It is located 3 km from Vizianagaram.

References

Villages in Vizianagaram district